Tonal Patterns ( 平仄 ) is a work for symphony orchestra,
composed by He Xuntian in 1985.

Summary
He Xuntian adopted RD Composition (Renyilv Duiyingfa Composition) in his work Tonal Patterns.

First performance
Tonal Patterns
He Xuntian Symphony Works Concert 1988
30. November 1988, Beijing Concert Hall, Beijing
China National Symphony Orchestra

References

Compositions by He Xuntian
Compositions for symphony orchestra
1985 compositions